Ophidion may refer to:

 Ophidion (plant), a genus of orchids
 Ophidion (fish), a genus of cusk-eels